Nemanja Vuković (Cyrillic: Немања Вуковић; born 13 April 1984) is a Montenegrin football coach and former player.

Playing career

Club
Vuković started his career in Montenegro with FK Kom in 2003. In 2005, he signed with FK Budućnost Podgorica in Montenegro. In 2009, he moved to Greek Beta Ethniki side Panetolikos. In summer 2011, he returned to Montenegro with OFK Grbalj.

In March 2012, Vuković signed with Columbus Crew of Major League Soccer. He was released at the end of the 2012 season.

Vuković returned to Montenegro in early 2013 with FK Mladost Podgorica. He was released in July 2013. In  July 2013 he signed a two-year contract with Ukrainian side FC Hoverla Uzhhorod.

In 2014, Vuković signed with expansion club Sacramento Republic FC of the USL Pro. He started 33 games as the new club won the 2014 USL Pro championship.

Vuković transferred to North American Soccer League side Indy Eleven on 19 January 2016.

In April 2018, Vukovic joined Tulsa Roughnecks FC in the United Soccer League.

References

External links

 

1984 births
Living people
Footballers from Podgorica
Association football defenders
Serbia and Montenegro footballers
Montenegrin footballers
FK Kom players
FK Budućnost Podgorica players
Panetolikos F.C. players
OFK Grbalj players
Columbus Crew players
OFK Titograd players
FC Hoverla Uzhhorod players
Sacramento Republic FC players
Indy Eleven players
FC Tulsa players
Second League of Serbia and Montenegro players
First League of Serbia and Montenegro players
Montenegrin First League players
Football League (Greece) players
Major League Soccer players
USL Championship players
North American Soccer League players
Montenegrin expatriate footballers
Expatriate footballers in Greece
Montenegrin expatriate sportspeople in Greece
Expatriate soccer players in the United States
Montenegrin expatriate sportspeople in the United States
Expatriate footballers in Ukraine
Montenegrin expatriate sportspeople in Ukraine